Many cities and towns in Myanmar were renamed in 1989 by the State Law and Order Restoration Council following a seizure of power by Saw Maung. Some places were renamed to their traditional, pre-colonial names, others were simply a bid to make their spellings better reflect their true Burmese pronunciation.

References